Ada is a 1961 American political drama film produced by Avon Productions and distributed by Metro-Goldwyn-Mayer. It was directed by Daniel Mann and produced by Lawrence Weingarten, with a screenplay by Arthur Sheekman and William Driskill based on the novel Ada Dallas by Wirt Williams.

The film stars Susan Hayward, Dean Martin, Wilfrid Hyde-White, Ralph Meeker and Martin Balsam.

Plot
Bo Gillis is a guitar-playing man from a Southern state who becomes a populist candidate for governor. He is elected after his opponent's wife is revealed to have a dark secret, a fact exposed by Bo's campaign mastermind Sylvester Marin.

Shortly before the election, Bo visits a nightclub, where he meets a prostitute named Ada Dallas. They share a similar upbringing, and Bo feels an immediate bond. They are soon married, which upsets Bo's assistant Steve and Sylvester, who wants the marriage annulled.

The Gillises resist and begin life as the state's first couple. Soon the governor finds that he is little more than a stooge, blindly signing documents at Sylvester's behest. His childhood friend Ronnie is dismissed as lieutenant governor for opposing Sylvester. To control Bo, Sylvester requests help from Ada, who demands to be appointed lieutenant governor in return.

Bo is furious with Ada for becoming part of the sordid political scene. After he continues to oppose Sylvester's influence, a bomb explodes in his car, severely injuring him. In the hospital, Bo accuses Ada of conspiring to murder him, and she angrily leaves him.

Ada takes the oath as acting governor but then begins to defy Sylvester, promoting Bo's ideas for honest government. Her former madam tricks her into offering $10,000 to remain quiet about Ada's past.

During a decisive vote at the state capitol, as Bo views from the gallery, Sylvester and his henchman Yancey try to sabotage Ada's plans by revealing her dark secret. Bo delivers an impromptu speech to defend Ava. Sylvester is ruined, and Bo and Ada depart the capitol, reunited.

Cast

 Susan Hayward as Ada Gillis
 Dean Martin as Bo Gillis
 Wilfrid Hyde-White as Sylvester Marin
 Ralph Meeker as Col. Yancey
 Martin Balsam as Steve Jackson
 Frank Maxwell as Ronnie Hallerton
 Connie Sawyer as Alice Sweet
 Ford Rainey as Speaker
 Charles Watts as Al Winslow
 Larry Gates as Joe Adams
 Robert S. Simon as Natfield
 Bill Zuckert as Harry Davers
 Nesdon Booth as Walter Dow
 Emory Parnell as Security Guard (uncredited)

Reception

Box office
According to MGM records, the film lost $2,372,000.

See also
 List of American films of 1961

References

External links

 
 
 
 
 
 

1961 films
1960s political drama films
American political drama films
1960s English-language films
Films about politicians
Films about prostitution in the United States
Films based on American novels
Films directed by Daniel Mann
Films scored by Bronisław Kaper
Metro-Goldwyn-Mayer films
1961 drama films
1960s American films